Avraham Menchel(born December 12, 1935) is a former Israeli footballer. He is best known for his years at Maccabi Haifa where he started his football career as well as his managerial career. Menchel is widely regarded as one of the best Haifa players to ever don the green shirt.

Career statistics

International goals

References

External links
  Profile and biography of Avraham Menchel on Maccabi Haifa's official website

1935 births
Living people
Israeli Jews
Israeli footballers
Maccabi Haifa F.C. players
Israel international footballers
1960 AFC Asian Cup players
Israeli football managers
Maccabi Haifa F.C. managers
Association football midfielders